Denys Berinchyk (born 5 May 1988) is a Ukrainian professional boxer. As an amateur, he won silver medals in the light-welterweight division at the 2011 World Championships and the 2012 Summer Olympics. He made his professional bare knuckle debut on 24th July 2021, defeating former UFC Fighter Artem Lobov by TKO.

He has a PhD in physical education and sport, obtained at the National University of Ukraine on Physical Education and Sport.

Amateur boxing career

2011 World Amateur Boxing Championships 
In the 2011 World Championships, he beat the No.1 seeded and reigning champion Cuban Roniel Iglesias Solotongo on points. In the gold medal bout, he was beaten by Everton Lopes of Brazil following the encounter ended 26–23. Finished the championship as silver medalist, Berinchyk was a part of the Ukraine national team, topped the medal table.

Highlights

2012 Summer Olympics 
At the 2012 Summer Olympics, he had a bye into the second round, where he beat Anthony Yigit.  He went on to beat Jeff Horn and then Uranchimegiin Mönkh-Erdene in the semi-final.  In the final he lost to Roniel Iglesias, 15-22.

Professional boxing career 
Berinchyk made his professional debut against Tarik Madni on 29 August 2015. He won the fight by a fourth-round stoppage, as Madni retired at the end of the round. Berinchyk amassed a 7-0 record during the next two years, with four stoppage victories.

Berinchyk was booked to face Allan Vallespin for the vacant WBO Oriental lightweight title on 16 December 2017, in the main event of a card which took place at the Ice Palace Terminal in Brovary, Ukraine. He won the fight by a dominant sixth-round knockout. Berinchyk made his first WBO Oriental title defense against Jose Luis Prieto on 23 June 2018. He won the fight by a sixth-round stoppage, as Prieto retired at the end of the round.

Berinchyk was scheduled to face  for the vacant WBO International lightweight title Rosekie Cristobal on 22 December 2018. He won the fight by a seventh-round technical knockout. Berinchyk made his first WBO International title defense against the veteran Nihito Arakawa on 20 April 2019. He won the fight by unanimous decision, with scores of 120-107, 118-109 and 120-107. Berinchyk made his second title defense against Patricio Lopez Moreno on 5 October 2019. He won the fight by unanimous decision, with scores of 120-109, 120-108 and 120-108.

Berinchyk was booked to make his third title defense against the 21-1 Hector Edgardo Sarmiento on 22 February 2020. He won the fight by unanimous decision, with scores of 117-112, 118-110 and 117-111. Berinchyk made his fourth WBO International title defense against Viorel Simion on 8 October 2020. Simion retired from the bout at the end of the seventh round.

Berinchyk made the fifth defense of his WBO regional title against Jose Sanchez on 21 March 2021. He made quick work of Sanchez, as he won the fight by a third-round technical knockout. Berinchyk made his sixth title defense against the former WBO International titleholder Isa Chaniev on 19 December 2021. He won the fight by unanimous decision, with scores of 118-112, 116-112 and 118-111.

Bare knuckle boxing career

Berinchyk made his bare-knuckle boxing debut against the former UFC fighter Artem Lobov at Mahatch FC 6 on 24 July 2021. Lobov retired from the bout at the end of the fourth round.

Professional boxing record

Bare knuckle record

|Win
|align=center|1–0
|align=left| Artem Lobov
|TKO (retirement)
|Mahatch FC 6
|
|align=center|4
|align=center|2:00
|Kyiv, Ukraine
|
|-

See also
 2011 World Amateur Boxing Championships
 2010 World University Boxing Championship

References

External links

 Profile on AIBA
 2011 World Championships results
 

1988 births
People from Krasnodon
Living people
Lightweight boxers
Olympic boxers of Ukraine
Boxers at the 2012 Summer Olympics
Olympic silver medalists for Ukraine
Olympic medalists in boxing
Medalists at the 2012 Summer Olympics
Ukrainian male boxers
AIBA World Boxing Championships medalists
Universiade medalists in boxing
Universiade bronze medalists for Ukraine
Medalists at the 2013 Summer Universiade
Recipients of the Order of Danylo Halytsky
Sportspeople from Luhansk Oblast